František Donth, or Franz Donth in German (1896 in Rokytnice nad Jizerou - 11 July 1976 in Ilsenburg) was an Ethnic German Nordic skier who competed for Czechoslovakia in cross-country skiing in the 1920s. He won four medals at the FIS Nordic World Ski Championships with a gold in the 50 km (1925), two silvers in the 18 km (1925, 1927), and bronze in the 50 km (1927).

At the 1928 Winter Olympics he finished eleventh in the 18 km competition and 14th in the 50 km event.

Franz Donth was an ethnic German, who competed for the Hauptverband Deutscher Wintersportvereine der Tschechoslowakischen Republik (Central Federation of German Winter Sports Associations of the Czechoslovak Republic).

References

 
 

1896 births
1976 deaths
Czech male cross-country skiers
Czechoslovak male cross-country skiers
Olympic cross-country skiers of Czechoslovakia
Cross-country skiers at the 1928 Winter Olympics
FIS Nordic World Ski Championships medalists in cross-country skiing
Sudeten German people